Coin roll hunting (often abbreviated as CRH) is the hobby of searching and sorting coinage pulled from circulation for collectible coins. This is achieved through obtaining rolled coin, boxed coin, or bagged coin from banks and credit unions. A variant of this practice involves banknotes and is carried out in essentially the same fashion, normally to search for unusual serial numbers, star notes, and misprints.

Coin roll hunting in the United States

In the United States, coin roll hunters obtain rolls of cents, nickels, dimes, quarters, halves, and sometimes small and large dollar coins, most commonly through withdrawing an amount of money from a bank account in the denomination desired.

Prime targets of American coin roll hunters are silver dimes, quarters, and halves prior to 1965, and 40% silver half dollars from 1965–1970. Nickels are searched for 35% silver "war nickels" (1942–1945 with mint marks on top of the Monticello on the reverse). Older discontinued designs such as the Buffalo and Liberty ("V") nickels are also collected. Cents are also searched for older designs such as copper wheat cents (1909–1958, made out of zinc plated steel in 1943), Indian head cents (1859–1909), and errors and varieties such as doubled dies and close and wide “AM” cents. Some searchers also save copper memorial Lincoln cents (1959–1982) for their growing value as copper bullion. Toned coins are also of interest to collectors, and are occasionally found in coin rolls, particularly on the ends of old bank wrapped coin rolls. An occasional darkly discolored or corroded nickel, dime, quarter, or half dollar can fool the collector by its edge, giving off the appearance of a silver coin. Often coin roll hunters also collect special proof coins, tokens and other exonumia, and foreign coins. Others attempt to find and complete a set of coins, like the America the Beautiful Quarters, 50 State Quarters, Presidential Dollars, or even every year and mint of regular designs. Other special issues collected by some include the bicentennial quarters and halves (1976), bicentennial Lewis and Clark nickels (2004–2005), and the lower mintage bicentennial Lincoln cents (2009). Specific dates of specific denominations that are rarer than others or minted in lower-than-usual quantities may also be taken from circulation, such as 1970, 1987, or 2002 to present halves, 2009 nickels and dimes, or 2002–2008 Sacagawea dollars. Coins of low mintage are known as “semi-key dates”, while coins of very low mintage are known as “key dates”. Some famous key date coins include the 1909 S VDB wheat cent, the 1950 D Jefferson nickel, and the 1916 D Mercury dime. People search the rolls for error coins that have defects from the minting process, such as the aforementioned doubled dies, coins struck with wrong planchets, and coins struck off center, etc. These coins can be worth more than face value to collectors, with some such as the 1955 doubled die cent potentially being worth thousands of dollars.

Coin roll hunting in Canada

In Canada, coin roll hunters obtain rolls of nickels, and sometimes dimes and quarters.

Dimes and quarters didn't have very high mint numbers until silver was discontinued in 1964. Coins after 1964 were then minted in very high numbers, making silver coins uncommon, plus the introduction of silver-rejecting bank machines took many silver coins out of circulation. This all made silver too hard to find for coin roll hunters, so they primarily search for 1922-1964 nickels for their numismatic value and for 1965-1981 Nickels for their metal value, which slightly exceeds their face value. Pre-1997 pennies were also pulled out of circulation due to their copper high metal value prior to the removal of pennies from circulation in 2013. Other roll hunters attempt to build sets of special quarters, loonies, and toonies.

Merits as a means of making money

The merits of coin roll hunting as a means of making money are hotly debated. It is not uncommon for coin roll hunters to search through multiple boxes of coins only to find nothing of value. The amount of silver left in circulation is constantly dwindling, and this is ironically exacerbated by collectors finding and removing circulating silver from the rolls that they hunt. Many seasoned veterans of coin roll hunting have commented that in the long run they would have been better off just buying the silver coins they have found as it would have been cheaper and easier once the cost of their time has been factored in. The expected return from coin roll hunting also varies based on what denomination is searched. US quarters and dimes tend to produce the worst as most of the silver from these denominations has already been pulled from circulation. Cents provide the best returns when collecting pre-1982 copper cents with the typical cent roll producing around 20% copper to 80% zinc cents. However, the amount of profit from searching cents is much lower due to the lower face value of the coin. When the US dollar is higher than the Canadian dollar, CRH enthusiasts often pull all the American coins to exchange or spend in the USA.

In the United States, it is illegal to melt down cents and nickels, so they cannot be legally redeemed for their metal content.

See also

Coin rolling scams
Coin wrapper
Bank strap

References

Banking
Numismatics